There are over 9,000 Grade I listed buildings in England.  This page is a list of these buildings in the county of Nottinghamshire, by district.

Ashfield

|}

Bassetlaw

|}

Broxtowe

|}

City of Nottingham

|}

Gedling

|}

Mansfield

|}

Newark and Sherwood

|}

Rushcliffe

|}

See also
:Category:Grade I listed buildings in Nottinghamshire
Grade II* listed buildings in Nottinghamshire

Notes

References 

National Heritage List for England
Search for information on England's historic sites and buildings, including images of listed buildings.

External links

 
Nottinghamshire
Lists of listed buildings in Nottinghamshire